Examili ( or Εξαμήλι) is a village and a community of the Lagkadas municipality. Before the 2011 local government reform, it was part of the municipality of Assiros. The 2011 census recorded 241 inhabitants in the village. Examili is a part of the community of Assiros.

See also
 List of settlements in the Thessaloniki regional unit

References

History of Examili

The original Examili settlement was located at the beginning of the Gallipoli Peninsula

Its name was taken from its geographical position being 6 miles between the 2 peninsula coasts.

Examili developed into a large Greek city with a fortified wall protecting the Gallipoli Peninsula from the mainland.

Since Turkish occupation, the original settlement has been destroyed and is now a site of a Turkish army base being close to the existing Turkish town of Korukoy.

Following the Turkish war, many Greeks did not survive the exodus from the Gallipoli Peninsula, however hundreds of families from Examili settled in Galatades Northern Greece in 1921.

The area being low lying was marshy and mosquitoes quickly spread malaria taking many lives.
 
The construction of canals reclaimed the marshes, expanded farming land and improved health conditions.

During this time Christos Cavornaris, understanding the problems of over population, wanted to establish a new settlement for a portion of the population.
 
Moving westward temporarily to the small settlement of Stefanya, he successfully petitioned parliament 1921 to establish a new Examili settlement at its present site.

During 1922 and 1923 the new township was planned and built.
 
Christos Cavornaris being the founder was also nominated as Examili's 1st president.

Landmarks were also named by the locals such as:

Kato Vrisi; a permanent spring water source supplying the Village.
Sovlemesi Hill (marked with a cross) and Sasakros Hill (marked with a church) were named after the local families who tendered their sheep flocks on their respective slopes.

This is a list of the original families residing in Examili once the village was constructed in 1923;
Albani 
Anglithis 
Bazakli 
Cavornaris 
Diamandopoulos 
Dimitriathis 
Hazandoniou 
Hazilaskaris 
Hazinicolau 
Kakouras 
Magiris 
Mickalaci 
Psalti 
Sasakaro 
Thamaschino 
Yiannico

Source http://mmmam123.wix.com/examili
Website http://mmmam123.wix.com/examili
information shared with permission

Populated places in Thessaloniki (regional unit)